is a railway station on the Sōya Main Line in Wakkanai, Hokkaido, Japan, operated by Hokkaido Railway Company (JR Hokkaido).

Lines
The station is numbered "W79".

Layout
Double track loop, two side platforms, single siding.

Adjacent stations

History
The station opened on 25 June 1924, initially named . It was renamed Minami-Wakkanai on 1 February 1939 at the same time as the former  was renamed Wakkanai Station.

With the privatization of Japanese National Railways (JNR) on 1 April 1987, the station came under the control of JR Hokkaido.

See also
 List of railway stations in Japan

References

External links

  

Stations of Hokkaido Railway Company
Railway stations in Hokkaido Prefecture
Railway stations in Japan opened in 1924
Wakkanai, Hokkaido